M. formosa may refer to:

 Macarostola formosa, an Oceanian moth
 Marmosa formosa, a mouse opossum
 Mesodma formosa, an extinct mammal
 Mesosemia formosa, a South African butterfly
 Myrmarachne formosa, a jumping spider
 Myrmecia formosa, an Australian ant